Yermolino is a rural locality (a village) in Petushinskoye Rural Settlement, Petushinsky District, Vladimir Oblast, Russia. The population was 20 as of 2010. There are 4 streets.

Geography 
Yermolino is located on the Laska River, 17 km north of Petushki (the district's administrative centre) by road. Sanino is the nearest rural locality.

References 

Rural localities in Petushinsky District